Jean-Philippe Mattio (born 24 February 1965) is a retired French football defender.

Career

Mattio started his career with OGC Nice.

References

1965 births
Living people
French footballers
OGC Nice players
Association football defenders
Ligue 1 players
Ligue 2 players